The second Tulsa Roughnecks were an American soccer team that played in the United Soccer Leagues from 1993–99.

History
In January 1993, Tulsa businessman "Mack" Amini applied for a franchise in the United States Interregional Soccer League.  The application was approved and the team began play in the summer of 1993 under head coach Ali Adibi who had been coaching the Southern Nazarene soccer team.  In 1994, Adibi was named Coach of the Year. Adibi resigned in 1995 and was replaced by Zeljko "Vince" Krsnik.  Krsnik lasted only three weeks before being fired.  Adibi replaced him as interim coach, but the coaching turmoil led to drop in the standings.  Tulsa, which had finished in either first or second place each season, now finished in seventh.  In September 1995, the team elevated player Victor Moreland to the head coaching position.  In November 1996, Adibi returned again as head coach.  Adibi would continue to coach the team until it folded in 1999, except for several games during the summer of 1998 when two players shared the duties of coach as Adibi dealt with business matters.  During the winter of 1998–1999, the Roughnecks did not play an indoor season for the first time in its existence.  In 1999, the team went under new ownership which renamed it the Green Country Roughnecks.  In 1999, Adibi purchased the team, renamed it the Tulsa Roughnecks and withdrew it from the USL.  The Roughnecks spent the 1999–2000 winter season playing with several unafilliated indoor teams in an ad hoc league.  The Roughnecks were good enough to go the championship game where they fell to the Oklahoma City Hatters.  Adibi disbanded the team at the end of the season.

Year-by-year

Indoor

Outdoor

Coaches
 Ali Adibi (1993–1995)
 Zeljko "Vince" Krsnik (1995)
 Ali Adibi (1995)
 Victor Moreland (1995–1996)
 Ali Adibi (1996–2000)
 Tama Andofar / Jason Maricle (1998 – interim)

References

External links
SISL/USISL: 1986–1993
USISL: 1994–1996
USISL: 1997–1999

Sports in Tulsa, Oklahoma
Defunct soccer clubs in Oklahoma
Defunct indoor soccer clubs in the United States
USL Second Division teams
1993 establishments in Oklahoma
2000 disestablishments in Oklahoma
Soccer clubs in Oklahoma
Association football clubs established in 1993
Association football clubs disestablished in 2000

it:Tulsa Roughnecks